Legacy: An Off-Color Novella for You to Color is a 2017 novella and coloring book by Chuck Palahniuk.

Overview
A dark fable about aspiring immortals, an amoral banker and his despicable family, and a stalker.

References

External links
Chuck Palahniuk: Legacy (Novella)

2017 American novels
Novels by Chuck Palahniuk
English-language novels
Coloring books
American novellas
Dark Horse Comics titles
Dark Horse Books books